The Byte Code Engineering Library (BCEL) is a project sponsored by the Apache Foundation previously under their Jakarta charter to provide a simple API for decomposing, modifying, and recomposing binary Java classes (I.e. bytecode). The project was conceived and developed by Markus Dahm prior to officially being donated to the Apache Jakarta foundation on 27 October 2001.

Uses
BCEL provides a simple library that exposes the internal aggregate components of a given Java class through its API as object constructs (as opposed to the disassembly of the lower-level opcodes). These objects also expose operations for modifying the binary bytecode, as well as generating new bytecode (via injection of new code into the existing code, or through generation of new classes altogether.) The BCEL library has been used in several diverse applications, such as:
Java Bytecode Decompiling, Obfuscation, and Refactoring
Performance and Profiling
Instrumentation calls that capture performance metrics can be injected into Java class binaries to examine memory/coverage data. (For example, injecting instrumentation at entry/exit points.)
Implementation of New Language Semantics
For example, Aspect-Oriented additions to the Java language have been implemented by using BCEL to decompose class structures for point-cut identification, and then again when reconstituting the class by injecting aspect-related code back into the binary. (See: AspectJ)
Static code analysis
FindBugs uses BCEL to analyze Java bytecode for code idioms which indicate bugs.

See also
 
ObjectWeb ASM
Javassist

External links
Apache Commons BCEL - The BCEL Project Home Page.
BCEL-Based Project Listing - A listing of projects that make use of the BCEL Library.
Apache Jakarta Home - The Apache Jakarta Home Page.
AspectJ - The AspectJ Project Home Page. (One of the high-visibility projects that makes use of BCEL.)

Virtualization software